The Mizo language, or Mizo ṭawng, is a Kuki-Chin-Mizo language belonging to the Tibeto-Burman branch of the Sino-Tibetan family, spoken natively by the Mizo people in the Mizoram state of India and Chin State and Sagaing Division in Myanmar. The language is also known as Duhlian and Lushai, a colonial term, as the Duhlian people were the first among the Mizos to be encountered by the British in the course of their colonial expansion. The Mizo language is mainly based on Lusei dialect but it has also derived many words from its surrounding Mizo sub-tribes and sub-clan. Now, Mizo language or Mizo ṭawng is the lingua franca of Mizoram and its surrounding areas and to a lesser extent of Myanmar and Bangladesh and in India in some parts of Assam, Tripura, Manipur, Meghalaya and Nagaland. Many poetic languages are derived from Pawi, Zomi, and Hmar, and most known ancient poems considered to be Mizo are actually in Pawi. Mizo is the official language of Mizoram, along with English, and there have been efforts to have it included in the Eighth Schedule to the Constitution of India.

Cardinal numbers
They are as follows: 
1, pa -khat. 
2, pa -hnih.
3, pa-thum, 
4, pa -li. 
5, pa-nga.
6, pa-ruk. 
7, pa -sarih. 
8, pa- riat. 
9, pa -kua.
10, sawm.

Writing system
The Mizo alphabet is based on the Roman script and has 25 letters, namely:

In its current form, it was devised by the first Christian missionaries of Mizoram, Rev. J.H.Lorrain and Rev. F.W.Savidge based on Hunterian system of transliteration.

A circumflex ^ was later added to the vowels to indicate long vowels, viz., â, ê, î, ô, û, which were insufficient to fully express Mizo tone. Recently, a leading newspaper in Mizoram, Vanglaini, the magazine Kristian Ṭhalai, and other publishers began using á, à, ä, é, è, ë, í, ì, ï, ó, ò, ö, ú, ù, ü to indicate the long intonations and tones. However, this does not differentiate the different intonations that short tones can have.

Relation with other languages
The Mizo language is related to the other languages of the Sino-Tibetan family. The Kuki-Chin-Mizo languages (which native Mizo speakers call Zohnahthlâk ṭawngho/Mizo ṭawngho) have a substantial number of words in common.

Mizo and Sino-Tibetan languages
The following table illustrates the similarity between Mizo and other members of the Sino-Tibetan family. The words given are cognates, whose origins could be traced back to the proto-language Proto-Sino-Tibetan (given in the first column of the table).

References for the above table:

Mizo and Burmese
The following few words suggest that Mizo and the Burmese are of the same family: kun ("to bend"), kam ("bank of a river"), kha ("bitter"), sam ("hair"), mei ("fire"), that ("to kill"), ni ("sun"), hnih ("two"), li ("four"), nga ("five") etc.

Phonology

Vowels

Monophthongs 
The Mizo language has eight tones and intonations for each of the vowels a, aw, e, i and u, four of which are reduced tones and the other four long tones. The vowel o has only three tones, all of them of the reduced type; it has a similar sound to the diphthong /oʊ/ found in American English. The vowels can be represented as follows:

Diphthongs

Triphthongs
Mizo has the following triphthongs:
 iai, as in iai, piai
 iau as in riau ruau, tiau tuau etc.
 uai, as in uai, zuai, tuai, vuai
 uau, as in riau ruau, tiau tuau, suau suau

Consonants
Mizo has the following consonants, with the first symbol being its orthographical form and the second one its representation in the IPA:

 The glottal and glottalised consonants appear only in final position.

Tone
As Mizo is a tonal language, differences in pitch and pitch contour can change the meanings of words. Tone systems have developed independently in many daughter languages, largely by simplifications in the set of possible syllable-final and syllable-initial consonants. Typically, a distinction between voiceless and voiced initial consonants is replaced by a distinction between high and low tone, and falling and rising tones developed from syllable-final h and glottal stop, which themselves often reflect earlier consonants.

The eight tones and intonations that the vowel a (and the vowels aw, e, i, u, and this constitutes all the tones in the Mizo language) can have are shown by the letter sequence p-a-n-g, as follows:
 long high tone: páng as in páng là (which has the same intonation as sáng in the sentence Thingküng sáng tak kan huanah a ding).
 long low tone: pàng as in Tui a kawt pàng pâng mai (which has the same intonation as vàng in the word vànglaini).
 peaking tone: pâng as in Tui a kawt pàng pâng mai (which has the same intonation as thlûk in I hla phuah thlûk chu a va mawi ve).
 dipping tone: päng as in Tuibur a hmuam päng mai (which has the same intonation as säm in Kan huan ka säm vêl mai mai).
 short rising tone: pǎng as in naupǎng (which has the same intonation as thǎng in Kan huanah thǎng ka kam).
 short falling tone: pȧng as in I va inkhuih pȧng ve? (which has the same intonation as pȧn in I lam ka rawn pȧn )
 short mid tone: pang as in A dik lo nghâl pang (which has the same tone as man in Sazu ka man )
 short low tone: pạng as in I pạng a sá a nih kha (which has the same tone as chạl in I chạlah thosí a fù ).

Note that the exact orthography of tones with diacritics is still not standardised (notably for differentiating the four short tones with confusive or conflicting choices of diacritics) except for the differentiation of long versus short tones using the circumflex. As well, the need of at least 7 diacritics may cause complications to design easy keyboard layouts, even if they use dead keys, and even if not all basic Latin letters are needed for Mizo itself, so publications may represent the short tones using digrams (e.g. by appending some apostrophe or glottal letter) to reduce the number of diacritics needed to only 4 (those used now for the long tones) on only two dead keys.

Sample sentences
The following table illustrates the pronunciations of various consonants, vowels and diphthongs found in the Mizo language:

References and further reading for this section.

Grammar

Mizo contains many analyzable polysyllables, which are polysyllabic units in which the individual syllables have meaning by themselves. In a true monosyllabic language, polysyllables are mostly confined to compound words, such as "lighthouse". The first syllables of compounds tend over time to be de-stressed, and may eventually be reduced to prefixed consonants. The word nuntheihna ("survival") is composed of nung ("to live"), theih ("possible") and na (a nominalising suffix); likewise, theihna means "possibility". Virtually all polysyllabic morphemes in Mizo can be shown to have originated in this way. For example, the disyllabic form bakhwan ("butterfly"), which occurs in one dialect of the Trung (or Dulung) language of Yunnan, is actually a reduced form of the compound blak kwar, found in a closely related dialect. It is reported over 18 of the dialects share about 850 words with the same meaning. For example, ban ("arm"), ke ("leg"), thla ("wing", "month"), lu ("head") and kut ("hand").

Word order

The declarative word order in Mizo is Object-subject-verb (OSV). For example:

However, even if one says Ka ziak lehkhabu, its meaning is not changed, nor does it become incorrect; the word order becomes Subject-verb-object. But this form is used only in particular situations.

Verbs

Conjugation
The verbs (called thiltih in Mizo) are not conjugated as in languages such as English and French by changing the desinence of words, but the tense (in a sentence) is clarified by the aspect and the addition of some particles, such as
ang (for forming simple future),
tawh (for forming simple past and past perfect),
mék (for forming progressive tenses, present and past),
dáwn (for forming simple future),
dáwn mék (for forming near future),
etc.

Modification of verbs
Mizo verbs are often used in the Gerund, and most verbs change desinence in the Gerund; this modification is called tihdanglamna. This modified form is also used as the past participle. Some verbs which undergo modification are tabulated below:

However, even if the spelling of a verb is not changed, its tone is sometimes changed. For example, the verbs tum (to aim), hum (to protect) etc. change tones; the tone is lowered in the modified form. There is a third class of verbs – those which neither change tone nor are inflected (modified). Examples include hneh (to conquer), hnek (to strike with one's fist).

Modification of words is not restricted to verbs; adjectives, adverbs etc. are also modified.

Nouns

Construction
There is no gender for nouns, and there are no articles. There are some specific suffixes for forming nouns from verbs and adjectives, the most common of which are -na and -zia. The suffix -na is used for forming nouns from both verbs and adjectives, whereas -zia is used specifically for nominalising adjectives. For example,
 tlù (v. to fall) – tlûkna (n. fall)
 hmù (v. to see) – hmuhna (n. sight, seeing, vision)
 suäl (adj. evil) – suàlna (n. sin)/suàlzia (n. evilness)

Declension of nouns
Mizo nouns undergo declension into cases. The main cases can be classified as follows:
{|class="wikitable"
|-
!Case!!Desinence!!Tone (in pronunciation)!!Examples
|-
!scope="row"|NominativeAccusativeGenitive
|no change
| ---
|1. tui 2. nula 3. hmangaihna
|-
!scope="row"|Ergative
|rowspan="2"|suffix -in for non-proper nouns, n for proper nouns
|short low pitch for -in|rowspan="2"|1. tuiin 2. nulain3. hmangaihnain|-
!scope="row"|Instrumental
|short high pitch on -in
|-
!scope="row"|Locative
|suffix -ah
|
|1. tuiah 2. nulaah 3. hmangaihnaah|-
|}

Pluralisation
Nouns are pluralized by suffixing -te, -ho, -teho or -hote, for example:

Pronouns

Forms
All Mizo pronouns occur in two forms, namely in free form and clitic form:

The free form is mostly used for emphasis, and has to be used in conjunction with either the clitic form or an appropriate pronominal particle, as shown in the following examples:
 Kei (=I free form) ka (=I clitic form)lo tel ve kher a ngai em?. This is a somewhat emphatic way of saying Ka lo tel ve kher a ngai em?
 Nangni (=you pl., free form) in (you pl., clitic form) zo tawh em? This is a somewhat emphatic way of saying Nangni in zo tawh em?
 Ani (he/she) a (s/he) kal ve chuan a ṭha lo vang.

The clitic form is also used as a genitive form of the pronoun.

Declension
Mizo pronouns, like Mizo nouns, are declined into cases as follows:

Adjectives
Mizo adjectives (Mizo: hrilhfiahna) follow the nouns they describe, as follows:

Negation
For declarative sentences, negation is achieved by adding the particle lo (not) at the end of a sentence. For example,

Also, for words such as engmah (nothing), tumah (nobody) etc., unlike English we have to add the negation particle lo; for example

Thus we have to use double negation for such cases.

Unique parts of speech
All kinds of Parts of Speech like noun, pronoun, verbs, etc. can be found in Mizo language with some additional unique kinds – post-positions and double adverbs'''.

Sample texts
The following is a sample text in Mizo of Article 1 of the Universal Declaration of Human Rights:

 Some Mizo words and phrases 

Cardinal numbers

Literature

Books
Mizo has a thriving literature with Mizo departments in Mizoram University and Manipur University . The governing body is the Mizo Academy of Letters, which awards the annual literary prize MAL Book of the Year since 1989. The books awarded so far and their authors are tabulated below along with the years:

This award is only for books originally written in Mizo, not for translations, and it has been awarded every year since 1989. The award has been given to books on history and religion, but most of its winners are novels. Each year, the academy examines about 100 books (in 2011, 149 books were examined), out of which it selects the top 20, and then shortlisting it further to top 10, and then to top 5, then top 3, finally chooses the winner.

The academy also awards lifetime achievement in Mizo literature.

Some of the best-known Mizo writers include James Dokhuma, Ṭhuamtea Khawlhring, C. Laizawna, C. Lalnunchanga, Vanneihtluanga etc.

Newspaper
The Mizoram Press Information Bureau lists some twenty Mizo daily newspapers just in Aizawl city, as of March 2013. The following list gives some of the most well-known newspapers published in the Mizo language.

Most of them are daily newspapers.

Statistics
There are around 850,000 speakers of the Mizo language: 830,846 speakers in India (2011 census); 1,041 speakers in Bangladesh (1981 census); 12,500 speakers in Myanmar (1983 census).

See also
Hunterian transliteration
Mizo grammar
Mizo literature

References

Sources
 K. S. Singh: 1995, People of India-Mizoram, Volume XXXIII, Anthropological Survey of India, Calcutta.
 Grierson, G. A. (Ed.) (1904b). Tibeto-Burman Family: Specimens of the Kuki-Chin and Burma Groups, Volume III Part III of Linguistic Survey of India. Office of the Superintendent of Government Printing, Calcutta.
 Grierson, G. A: 1995, Languages of North-Eastern India, Gian Publishing House, New Delhi.
 Lunghnema, V., Mizo chanchin (B.C. 300 aṭanga 1929 A.D.), 1993.
 Zoramdinthara, Dr., Mizo Fiction: Emergence and Development. Ruby Press & Co.(New Delhi). 2013. 

External links

Lorrain, J. Herbert (James Herbert) Dictionary of the Lushai language''. Calcutta : Asiatic Society, 1940. (Bibliotheca Indica, 261)
Sino-Tibetan Etymological Dictionary and Thesaurus database
Mizoram.nic.in Official website of Mizoram.
Mizoram Presbyterian
Mizoram Baptist
Mizoram Adventist 

 
Languages of Mizoram
Languages of Bangladesh
Kuki-Chin languages
Object–subject–verb languages